Kasouga or Kasuka is a small village in Sarah Baartman District Municipality in the Eastern Cape province of South Africa.

Settlement some 10 km north-east of Kenton-on-Sea, near the mouth of the Kasuka River. The name is derived from Khoekhoen and means 'place of many leopards'. The river name "Kasuka" is a Xhosa adaptation of the word, and has the same meaning.

References

Populated places in the Ndlambe Local Municipality